Blue Card may refer to:

 Blue card, a penalty card used in many sports
 Blue card, a permit for handgun-purchasing issued in Rhode Island
 The Blue Card, a non-profit organization dedicated to providing financial assistance to destitute Holocaust survivors in the United States
 Blue card (Australia), a system used in Queensland as a prevention and monitoring system for people working with children and young people
 Blue Card (European Union), an approved EU-wide work permit
 Blue card index system, a matrix of names used by Ulster loyalist Brian Nelson